Anthony DiMaria (born 14 May 1966) is an American actor, producer, and director. He is also known for preserving the legacy of his uncle, Jay Sebring, a pioneering stylist who was killed by members of the Manson Family in 1969, during what is now known as the Tate murders.

Education
Anthony DiMaria was a 1984 graduate of Las Vegas' Bishop Gorman High School. In 1989, DiMaria earned his BFA at the University of Southern California (USC) School of Dramatic Arts.

In both educational and professional capacities, DiMaria has worked on stage in New York City with the The Barrow Group, Actors Studio, Neighborhood Playhouse, and Circle Rep LAB.

Jay Sebring documentary
In 2020 Anthony DiMaria released the feature documentary Jay Sebring....Cutting to the Truth, which presented a platform to correct and illuminate Jay Sebring's life outside the Manson murders. Distributed in North America by Shout Studios, the documentary was a critical success and featured in-depth investigative interviews with Quincy Jones, Nancy Sinatra, Quentin Tarantino, Dennis Hopper, and others.

In his 2020 Los Angeles Times review, critic Michael Ordoña found Cutting To the Truth to be "an impressive directorial debut for actor Anthony DiMaria," noting its "stylish" presentation, and an "absorbing and passionate" narrative.

Manson parole hearings 
Since 2004 Anthony DiMaria has represented his family and advocated for the Tate LaBianca family in the numerous parole hearings for Manson family members Patricia Krenwinkel, Charles Watson, Leslie Van Houten, and Susan Atkins. DiMaria and his immediate family have continuously and unfailingly urged the California Department of Corrections and Rehabilitation to deny any and all parole or release to the remaining Manson group. In one of Watson's parole hearings Anthony DiMaria commented, "These are troubled waters for many of us in here today and I would be remiss if I didn't state that I feel profound sorrow for all of us involved, and great sorrow for Mr. Watson."

In 2016, DiMaria urged the California Board to consider parole for Patricia Krenwinkel "when her victims are paroled from their graves."

In 2022, DiMaria spoke at Manson follower Bruce Davis' parole hearing, on behalf of families victimized by Davis' actions. DiMaria stated, "Bruce Davis remains in prison because his crimes were so severe and profound that they shook our country to its core, with permanent repercussions". Davis was denied parole.

Filmography (partial)

Film

Television

References

External links
 

1966 births
Living people
20th-century American male actors
21st-century American male actors
American people of Italian descent
American film producers
American male film actors
American male television actors